The South African Railways Class 8D  of 1903 was a steam locomotive from the pre-Union era in the Cape of Good Hope.

In 1903, when the first batch of 8th Class  Mastodon type locomotives had been tried and proven successful, the Cape Government Railways placed another 38 8th Class  steam locomotives in service, six on the Western System, twenty on the Midland System and twelve on the Eastern System. In 1912, when they were assimilated into the South African Railways, they were renumbered and designated Class 8D.

Manufacture

Evolution
The first 8th Class locomotive of the Cape Government Railways (CGR) was a  Consolidation type, designed by H.M. Beatty, the Chief Locomotive Superintendent of the CGR from 1896 to 1910. It was later to be designated the South African Railways (SAR) Class 8X.

While these first Schenectady- and ALCO-built  locomotives were being subjected to exhaustive testing on all types of traffic and under varying conditions, some trouble was experienced with the leading two-wheeled pony truck. When designs were prepared at Salt River for a later order for more locomotives, the pony truck was replaced with a four-wheeled bogie.

These 38 locomotives were the second batch of CGR 8th Class locomotives to be built with a  Mastodon type wheel arrangement. In spite of the difference in wheel arrangement, the CGR's new post-7th Class Consolidations and Mastodons were all grouped together into the 8th Class.

Builders
They were ordered from Neilson, Reid and Company in 1902 and were delivered in four batches in 1903. While they were being built, Neilson, Reid amalgamated with Dübs and Company and Sharp, Stewart and Company to form the North British Locomotive Company (NBL). As a result, the last four of these locomotives were delivered as having been built by NBL at the Hyde Park shops of the former Neilson, Reid.

The locomotives were delivered with Type XE1 tenders and distributed between the CGR's Midland, Eastern and Western systems.
 Twenty were allocated to the Midland System, nineteen of them numbered in the range from 366 to 384 and the twentieth numbered 399.
 Twelve, numbered in the range from 783 to 794, went to the Eastern System.
 Six, numbered in the range from 807 to 812, went to the Western System.

Class 8 sub-classes
When the Union of South Africa was established on 31 May 1910, the three Colonial government railways (CGR, Natal Government Railways and Central South African Railways) were united under a single administration to control and administer the railways, ports and harbours of the Union. Although the South African Railways and Harbours came into existence in 1910, the actual classification and renumbering of all the rolling stock of the three constituent railways were only implemented with effect from 1 January 1912.

In 1912, these 38 locomotives were renumbered in the range from 1192 to 1229 and designated Class 8D on the South African Railways (SAR).

These locomotives, together with the rest of the CGR's 8th Class  Consolidations and 8th Class  Mastodons as well as the Class 8-L1 to 8-L3  Mastodon locomotives from the Central South African Railways (CSAR), were grouped into ten different sub-classes by the SAR. The  locomotives became SAR Classes 8 and 8A to 8F and the  locomotives became Classes 8X to 8Z.

Modifications

Superheating
During A.G. Watson's term as the Chief Mechanical Engineer of the SAR from 1929 to 1936, many of the Class 8 to Class 8F locomotives were equipped with superheated boilers, larger bore cylinders and either inside or outside admission piston valves.

Of the Class 8D locomotives, nine were equipped with superheated boilers,  bore cylinders and outside admission piston valves, while retaining their Class 8D classification.

Experimental chimney
In the early 1930s engine no. 1197 was fitted with an experimental chimney designed by Watson. A similar chimney, the shape of which earned it a nickname that referred to a night bucket, was also tested on Class 5B no. 726. This experiment did not result in further production.

Service
In SAR service, the  Class 8 family of locomotives served on every system in the country and, in the 1920s, became the mainstay of motive power on many branch lines. Their final days were spent in shunting service and they were all withdrawn by 1972.

Some were sold into industrial service after withdrawal, like no. 1211, which became Puffing Duggie at Grootvlei Proprietary Mines (GVPM).

Works numbers
The Class 8D and Class 8DW locomotive builders, works numbers, CGR to SAR renumbering and superheating modifications are listed in the table.

Illustration
The main picture shows reboilered and modified SAR Class 8D no. 1223 at the Bloemfontein locomotive depot on 22 March 1970. In the second picture below, the same locomotive is depicted before the modification.

References

1560
1560
4-8-0 locomotives
2D locomotives
Neilson Reid locomotives
NBL locomotives
Cape gauge railway locomotives
Railway locomotives introduced in 1903
1903 in South Africa